Petre Mihai Bănărescu (born 15 September 1921 in Craiova, Dolj County – died 12 May 2009 in Bucharest) was a Romanian ichthyologist. Bănărescu was a member of the Romanian Academy.

Bănărescu published around 300 papers in scholarly journals. In 1975 he was elected an honorary member of the American Society of Ichthyologists and Herpetologists and an honorary member of the European Society of Ichtyologists in 1988.

Education 
 1940–1944, the Student of the Faculty of Sciences (Department of Natural Sciences) at the University of Cluj,  where in 1949, he had his PhD thesis Research on the telestones encephalus related to the life and phylogeny.
 In 1962 he received the Doctor of Science Degree.

Fish described
Oxynoemacheilus araxensis

Ancherythroculter daovantieni

:Category:Taxa named by Petre Mihai Bănărescu

Tribute
Squalidus banarescui I. S. Chen & Y. C. Chang 2007 was named in honor of  Bănărescu, Institute of Biology, Bucharest, for his "great" contributions to Taiwanese cyprinid taxonomy, especially the subfamily Gobioninae, between 1960 and 1973.

Mesonoemacheilus petrubanarescui (Menon, 1984) was named in his honor.

References

External links

1921 births
2009 deaths
People from Craiova
Romanian ichthyologists
bănăr
20th-century Romanian zoologists